Bredele (also referred to as Bredala, Bredle or Winachtsbredele) are biscuits or small cakes traditionally baked in Alsace and Moselle, France, especially during the Christmas period. Many varieties can be found, including new ones, so that assortments can be created. They can include anisbredela (cake with egg white and aniseed) butterbredle, schwowebredle (orange and cinnamon), spritzbredle, small pain d'épices and spice cakes that are made with sugar rather than honey.

Baking Bredeles at Christmas is popular in Alsace. The tradition is for each family to bake its own, and then offer it as a Christmas gift to every person surrounding them.

The word comes from Low Alemannic German, which means Christmas cookies.

See also 
 Christmas cookies
 Alsatian cuisine
 Pain d'épices

References

Alsatian cuisine 
French desserts 
Biscuits 
Christmas food